Reincarnation of a Lovebird is a studio album by the American jazz bassist and composer Charles Mingus, recorded in November 1960.

Background
The record was not released until 1988 due to the closure of Candid Records soon after the recordings were made. In 1988, the British record producer Alan Bates revived the label. The revival triggered the issuing of several previously unreleased recordings, including this session.

The album is not to be confused with two other Mingus releases bearing the same title. A Prestige Records double album release contains recordings from a later period. In the United Kingdom, Mingus's 1957 Atlantic Records album The Clown was retitled Reincarnation of a Lovebird for a 1960s reissue.

Track listing
All compositions by Charles Mingus, except where indicated
"Reincarnation of a Lovebird No 2" – 6:58
"Wrap Your Troubles In Dreams" (Harry Barris) – 3:51
"R & R" – 11:51
"Body and Soul" (music: Johnny Green; lyrics: Edward Heyman, Robert Sour, Frank Eyton) – 13:49
"Bugs" - 8:29

Personnel
Charles Mingus – bass
Lonnie Hillyer - trumpet
Roy Eldridge - trumpet
Charles McPherson - alto saxophone
Eric Dolphy - flute, alto saxophone, bass clarinet
Booker Ervin - tenor saxophone
Jimmy Knepper - trombone
Paul Bley - piano
Tommy Flanagan - piano
Dannie Richmond - drums
Jo Jones - drums

References

1960 albums
Charles Mingus albums
Candid Records albums
Atlantic Records albums